Boysun district is a district in Surxondaryo Region, Uzbekistan. Its capital is the city of Boysun. The district consists of one city (Boysun), 5 urban-type settlements (Kofrun, Tangimush, Pasurxi, Qoraboʻyin, Rabot) and 7 rural communities. In 2019 it lost part of its territory to the re-established Bandixon District.

In 2001 the Boysun district was proclaimed as an intangible cultural heritage by UNESCO.

References

Districts of Uzbekistan
Surxondaryo Region
Masterpieces of the Oral and Intangible Heritage of Humanity